is a former Japanese football player and manager.

Playing career
Ninomiya was born in Kumamoto Prefecture on April 11, 1969. After graduating from University of Tsukuba, he joined Urawa Reds in 1992. In 1992, he moved to Uruguayan club Danubio on loan. In 1993, he returned to Urawa Reds and played many matches as forward. However he could not play at all in the match in 1994 and he moved to Regional Leagues club Prima Ham Tsuchiura (later Mito HollyHock). In 1997, the club was promoted to Japan Football League. He retired end of 1997 season.

Coaching career
After retirement, Ninomiya started coaching career at Mito HollyHock in 1998. He served as coach under manager Toshiya Miura. In 1999, he became a manager as Miura successor. The club won the 3rd place in 1999 Japan Football League and was promoted to J2 League. However he did not have a license for J.League manager. So, he returned to a coach in 2000. He left the club end of 2000 season.

Club statistics

References

External links

1969 births
Living people
University of Tsukuba alumni
Association football people from Kumamoto Prefecture
Japanese footballers
J1 League players
Japan Football League (1992–1998) players
Urawa Red Diamonds players
Mito HollyHock players
Japanese football managers
Mito HollyHock managers
Association football forwards